V Live is a live album by Vitalic released in 2007. The album is an exact recording of Vitalic's live performance in Ancienne Belgique, Brussels.

Track listing
"Polkamatic" – 2:05
"Disco Nouveau (live intro)" – 2:15
"Bambalec" – 1:57
"Anatoles" – 4:37
"Follow the Car" – 4:08
"Bells" – 5:19
"The 30000 Feet Club" – 5:35
"Rhythm in a Box 1 & 2" – 4:44
"La Rock 01" – 7:43
Filth n' Dirt - "Go Ahead (Vitalic Garage remix)" – 4:04
"My Friend Dario" – 3:58
"No Fun (Play the Guitar Johnny)" – 5:57
"Fast Lane" – 2:33
"Valletta Fanfares (live version outro)" - 4:18

External links
Vitalic official website

Vitalic albums
2007 live albums